Edith Borroff (August 2, 1925 – March 10, 2019) was an American musicologist and composer. Her compositions include over 60 commissioned works, including pieces for the stage; for her primary instrument—the organ; choral, vocal, and orchestral music; and several critical editions of works by previous composers such as Jubilate by J.-J. Cassanéa de Mondonville (Pittsburgh, 1961). She also wrote at least 7 books, including the textbook Music in Europe and the United States: a History (Englewood Cliffs, NJ, 1971/R), as well as various peer-reviewed articles and publications.

Life and career
Borroff was born in New York City, the daughter of professional musicians Marie Bergerson and (Albert) Ramon Borroff, and sister of poet Marie Borroff. The family moved to Chicago in 1941. Borroff studied at the Oberlin Conservatory of Music and the American Conservatory of Music, graduating with a Bachelor of Music in 1946,  a Master of Music in composition in 1948.  Her education included studying organ with Claire Coci at Oberlin College and voice with Frances Grund.

She joined the faculty at Milwaukee-Downer College from 1950–54 while continuing her studies at the University of Michigan in Ann Arbor, graduating with a Ph.D. in historical musicology by 1958.  Her dissertation was titled The instrumental works of Jean-Joseph Cassanéa de Mondonville.

In an 2011 interview with the American Composers Alliance, Borroff shared that she had always considered herself a composer. She started composing at a very young. According to her,  she was not allowed to pursue a degree in composition and settled for a degree in historical musicology but continued to compose and had over 60 commissions as a composer.

An extensive, yet selective, list of her works appears in the biographical article on Borroff in the Oxford Music Online/Grove Music dictionary accessible from most privatized university library databases.

After completing her studies, Borroff worked as a composer and music professor. She taught at Hillsdale College (where she also was associate dean) 1958-1962, University of Wisconsin-Milwaukee 1962-1966, Eastern Michigan University 1966-1972, and State University of New York at Binghamton, 1973 to 1992. Her Concerto for Marimba and Small Orchestra was premiered with that university's orchestra in 1981, with Alex Jacobowitz as marimba soloist and Paul Jordan as conductor.

Borroff retired from teaching in 1992. Her papers are housed at the Newberry Library. She died in Durham, North Carolina on March 10, 2019.

Works

For the stage 

 Spring over Brooklyn (musical), 1952
 Pygmalion (incid music, G.B. Shaw), S, chbr chorus, ww qnt, 2 perc, 1955
 La folle de chaillot (J. Giraudoux), S, perc, pf, 1960
 The Sun and the Wind
 a Musical Fable (op, 3 scenes, E. Borroff), 1977

For 4 or more instruments 

 String Quartet, c1942
 Grande rondo, string quartet, c1943
 String Trio, 1944, rev. 1952
 Theme and Variations for violincello and piano, c1944
 Quintet, cl, str, 1945
 String Quartet no.3, e minor, 1945
 Minuet, string orchestra, 1946
 Woodwind Quintet, D major, c1947
 Woodwind Quintet, C major, 1948
 Vorspiel über das Thema ‘In dulci jubilo’, 2 flutes, 2 horns, piano, 1951
 Variations for Band, 1965
 Chance Encounter (Romp or Rehearsal?), string quartet, 1974
 Game Pieces, suite, woodwind quintet, 1980
 Mar Concerto, 1981
 Suite: 8 Canons for 6 Players, percussion, 1984
 Mottoes, suite, 8 saxophones, 1989
 2 Pieces from the Old Rag Bag, sax quartet, 1989

For chorus and instruments 
Selected works:

The Christ-Child Lay on Mary's Lap (text G.K. Chesterton) for SSA choir (a cappella)
Passacaglia for organ (1946)
Sonata for horn and piano (1954)
Voices in Exile, 3 Canons for flute and viola (1962)
Five Pieces for viola and piano (1989)
Trio for viola, horn and piano (1999)

Scholarly publications 

An Introduction to Elisabeth-Claude Jacquet de La Guerre (Brooklyn, NY, 1966)
 Music of the Baroque (Dubuque: W.C. Brown, 1970)
 Music in Europe and the United States: a History (Englewood Cliffs, NJ, 1971/R)
 ed.: Notations and Editions: a Book in Honor of Louise Cuyler (Dubuque, IA, 1974/R)
 with M. Irvin: Music in Perspective (New York, 1976)
 Three American composers  (Lanham: University Press of America, 1986)
American Operas: A Checklist (Warren, Mich.: Harmonie Park Press, 1992)
Music Melting Round: a History of Music in the United States (New York: Ardsley House, 1995)
William Grant Still (was cited as forthcoming per Regier)

References

External links
List of works
Edith Borroff Papers at the Newberry Library

1925 births
2019 deaths
20th-century classical composers
21st-century classical composers
American women classical composers
American classical composers
American music educators
American women music educators
Milwaukee-Downer College faculty
University of Michigan alumni
21st-century American composers
Musicians from New York City
20th-century American women musicians
20th-century American musicians
20th-century American composers
21st-century American women musicians
Classical musicians from New York (state)
20th-century women composers
21st-century women composers
American women academics